Richards Bay Stadium is a multi-use stadium in Richards Bay, KwaZulu-Natal, South Africa. It is used mostly for football matches, and is currently home venue for National First Division club Thanda Royal Zulu, and for the Vodacom League clubs Bright Stars and Real Classic.

External links
Soccerway info about Richards Bay Sports Stadium

Sports venues in KwaZulu-Natal
Richards Bay
Soccer venues in South Africa